Henry Chapman Mercer (June 24, 1856 – March 9, 1930)  was an American archeologist, artifact collector, tile-maker, and designer of three distinctive poured concrete structures: Fonthill, his home; the Moravian Pottery and Tile Works; and the Mercer Museum.

Biography

Henry Mercer was born in Doylestown, Pennsylvania on June 24, 1856.  Mercer first traveled to Europe in 1870. He attended Harvard University between 1875 and 1879, obtaining a liberal arts degree. Mercer went on to study law at the University of Pennsylvania Law School between 1880 and 1881, and he read law with the firm of Freedley and Hollingsworth. The same year he began studying at the University of Pennsylvania, he became a founding member of the Bucks County Historical Society.

Mercer, however, never practiced law; he was admitted to the Philadelphia County Bar on November 9, 1881, but departed for Europe the same month. From 1881 to 1889, he traveled extensively through France and Germany.

The University of Pennsylvania Museum appointed Mercer as the Curator of American and Prehistoric Archaeology in the early 1890s.  Leaving his position with the Museum in the late 1890s, Mercer devoted himself to finding old American artifacts and learning about German pottery.  Mercer believed that American society was being destroyed by industrialism, which inspired his search for American artifacts.  Mercer founded Moravian Pottery and Tile Works in 1898 after apprenticing himself to a Pennsylvania German potter.  He was also influenced by the American Arts and Crafts Movement.

Mercer is well known for his research and books about ancient tool making, his ceramic tile creations, and his engineering and architecture.  He was among the paleontologists who investigated Port Kennedy Bone Cave.  He wrote extensively on his interests, which included archaeology, early tool making, German stove plates, and ceramics. He also published a collection of tales of the supernatural, November Night Tales in 1928. 
He assembled the collection of early American tools now housed in the Mercer Museum. Mercer's tiles are used in the floor of the Pennsylvania State Capitol Building in Harrisburg, Pennsylvania and in many other noteworthy buildings and houses.  In the Pennsylvania State Capitol, Mercer created a series of mosaic images for the floor of the building.  The series of four hundred mosaics trace the history of the Commonwealth of Pennsylvania from prehistoric times, and is the largest single collection of Mercer's tiles.  Other collections of tiles by Mercer can be found at Kykuit, the Rockefeller estate in Pocantico Hills, New York; Grauman's Chinese Theatre in Hollywood, California; the Casino at Monte Carlo in Monaco; and the St. Louis Public Library.

Mercer was an outspoken opponent of the plume trade.

Henry Ford stated that the Mercer museum was the only museum worth visiting in the United States, and the Mercer Museum was apparently Henry Ford's inspiration for his own museum, The Henry Ford, located in Dearborn, Michigan.  The Mercer Museum houses over forty thousand artifacts from early American society.  Mercer died on March 9, 1930, at Fonthill, the house he designed and constructed from reinforced concrete in 1908-1912.

The Bucks County Historical Society now owns Fonthill, which is open to the public, and the Mercer Museum. The Moravian Pottery and Tile Works is owned by the Bucks County Department of Parks & Recreation and operated as a working history museum by The TileWorks of Bucks County, a non-profit organization. These three buildings make up "the Mercer Mile". All three buildings were designed and constructed by Henry Mercer in the early part of the 20th century.

Publications
 The Lenape Stone, or the Indian and the Mammoth (1885)
 The Hill-Caves of Yucatan (1895)
 The Antiquity of Man in the Delaware Valley and the Eastern United States (1897)
 Guidebook to the Tiled Pavement in the Pennsylvania State Capitol (1908)
 The Bible in Iron (1914)
 November Night Tales (1928)
 Ancient Carpenters' Tools (1929)

Notes

References
 Cleota Reed, Henry Chapman Mercer and the Moravian Pottery and Tile Works (1996)
 Dyke, Linda F. Henry Chapman Mercer: An Annotated Chronology The Bucks County Historical Society (1996)
 Kurt Eichenberger, Design and Construction Techniques of an American Vernacular Architect: The Work of Dr. Henry Chapman Mercer, MIT Master of Architecture Thesis (1982)

External links
 Mercer Museum & Fonthill Castle
 The Bucks County Moravian Pottery & Tile Works
 Pennsylvania Capitol Preservation Committee's Mercer Biography

1856 births
1930 deaths
People from Doylestown, Pennsylvania
American archaeologists
19th-century American architects
American lawyers admitted to the practice of law by reading law
American non-fiction writers
Arts and Crafts movement artists
Concrete pioneers
Ghost story writers
Harvard University alumni
University of Pennsylvania Law School alumni
20th-century American architects